Jessie Mothersole (1874–1958) was a British archaeologist, artist, and author.

Early life and education 
Mothersole was born in Essex in 1874 and trained at the Slade School of Fine Art in London from 1891/92 until 1896. During this time Mothersole was awarded prizes and certificates in drawing from life and antique drawing. From 1899 Mothersole studied with and then worked with the artist Henry Holiday as his studio assistant and was closely associated with him and his family until his death in 1927. Holiday wrote enthusiastically in his memoirs about Mothersole's talent with stained glass and decorative arts and intended to bequeath her his collections of cartoons and drawings.

While at the Slade School of Fine Arts, Mothersole was also taught by Alphonse Legros and by her own account in 1892 when she went to speak to him found a discarded self-portrait which had been torn into eight pieces. Mothersole kept the pieces and later donated the drawing to the Victoria and Albert Museum. Mothersole also donated a silverpoint drawing of a young woman by Ellen Lucy Grazebrook.

Career
Mothersole's early work in archaeological drawing included drawings of wall paintings from Saqqara, exhibited by Flinders Petrie in an exhibition at University College London in 1904. These followed her work at the 1903/4 excavation season at Saqqara with Margaret Murray where alongside drawings Mothersole recorded the season with photographs, some of which were later published in an article "Tomb Copying in Egypt" for the family magazine Sunday at Home. Her A photograph credited to Mothersole from this period was taken at Luxor and is now in the Petrie Museum. Mothersole put on a further exhibition of her Egyptian work at Walker's Art Gallery, New Bond Street, London of Sketches in Egypt and other Works with Henry Holiday from 16 to 28 March 1908.

Following her early work in Egypt, Mothersole primarily focused on British archaeology. Mothersole's first illustrated book, concerning the Isles of Scilly, was published in 1910, and her first full-length book on Hadrian's Wall in 1922. For this she drew on both excavation reports and direct contacts with the archaeologists then excavating it as well making her own observations as she walked the wall's length. Her book offers a timely commentary on the Wall's scheduling that ensures its status as a protected ancient monument.

Mothersole's key watercolours of Hadrian's Wall were exhibited 30 October-11 November 1922 at Walker's Art Gallery.

Mothersole, like Henry Holiday, was an active campaigner for Women's suffrage. She made a drawing of a fellow campaigner, Myra Sadd Brown, at a meeting in c.1912 which is held in the archives of the Women's Library.

Select publications
1903. (Illustrator) Apuleius. The Story of Cupid and Pyche. Stuttaford, C. (ed.).
1905. (Illustrator) Murray, M.A. Saqqara Mastabas Part 1. London. Bernard Quaritch.
1910. The Isles of Scilly – their story, their folk, their flowers. London. The Religious Tract Society.
1922. Hadrian's Wall. London. Bodley Head. 
1924. The Saxon Shore. London. Bodley Head.
1926. Czechoslovakia – Land of an Unconquerable Ideal. New York. Dodd, Mead & Co.
1927. Agricola's Road into Scotland. London. Bodley Head
1927. In Roman Scotland. London. Bodley Head.

References

1874 births
1958 deaths
Women classical scholars
People from Colchester
British suffragists
British women archaeologists
Alumni of the Slade School of Fine Art
British archaeologists